Jean Louise Lennox Wilson (June 13, 1928 – January 27, 2014) was a Republican member of the Pennsylvania House of Representatives.

References

Republican Party members of the Pennsylvania House of Representatives
Women state legislators in Pennsylvania
2014 deaths
1928 births
21st-century American women